The Dictionary of African Biography is a six-volume biographical dictionary, published by Oxford University Press.  Published in 2012, the editors-in-chief are Emmanuel K. Akyeampong and Henry Louis Gates, Jr., both of the W. E. B. Du Bois Institute of Harvard University. 

The print version of the dictionary has 2,100 entries covering the whole of the continent of Africa, from 1490 BC to today; entries continue to be added online.

Awards 
 American Library Association Booklist Editors' Choice: Reference Sources (2012)

References

External links 
 Dictionary of African Biography from Oxford
 Oxford African American Studies Center (online version)

Biographical dictionaries
Books about Africa